New York's 47th State Senate district is one of 63 districts in the New York State Senate. It has been represented by Republican Joseph Griffo since 2007.

Geography
District 47 is located in north-central New York, covering all of Lewis County and parts of St. Lawrence and Oneida Counties. The district includes the cities of Rome and Utica.

The district overlaps with New York's 10th and 12th congressional districts, and with the 101st, 115th, 116th, 117th, 118th, 119th, and 121st districts of the New York State Assembly.

Recent election results

2020

2018

2016

2014

2012

Federal results in District 47

References

47